Yashavant Kanetkar is an Indian computer science author, known for his books on programming languages. He has authored several books on C, C++, VC++, C#, .NET, DirectX and COM programming. He is also a speaker on various technology subjects and is a regular columnist for Express Computers and Developer 2.0. Some of his most well-known books include Let Us C, Understanding Pointers In C and Test Your C Skills.

His one of the most famous book Let us C covers various topics that could be easily understood with the help of examples given with each programming concept. Besides, the book also features several descriptive details about console input, C preprocessor, arrays, functions, strings and pointers. Explained in comprehensive manner, the book aims to provide more brief information to all C programming beginners as well as established programmers.

He received the Microsoft Most Valuable Professional award for his work in programming from Microsoft for five consecutive years.

He obtained his B.E. from Veermata Jijabai Technological Institute and M.Tech from IIT Kanpur. He is the director of KICIT, a training company, and KSET. Both these companies are based in Nagpur.

Brief History
Yashavant originally specialized in mechanical engineering. He came to Delhi with the intention of starting a manufacturing business of making VIP suitcase locks. However, he was unable to receive a business loan from any banks. A bank manager told him about a computer scheme that the government had launched. For the benefits of the scheme, Yashavant decided to start a business in IT.

Bibliography (of selected books)
 ASP.NET Web Services
 Understanding Pointers in C()
 C Column Collection
 C Pearls
 C Projects
 C#.NET Fundas
 C++.Net Fundas
 C++. Net
 Data Structure Through C
 Data Structure Through C++
 Direct X Game Programming Fundas
 Exploring C
 Go Embedded
 Graphics Under C
 Introduction To OOPS & C++
 Interview Questions in C Programming
 Interview Questions in C++ Programming
 Java Servlets JSP
 Let Us C - 9th Ed.
 Let Us C Solutions - 9th Ed.
 Let Us C++
 Let Us Python - 2nd Ed.
 Object Oriented Programming with C++
 Programming Experience in BASIC
 Test Your C Skill - 2nd Ed.
 Test Your C++ Skill
 Test Your C#.NET Skills: Language Elements Pt. 1
 Test Your Unix Skill
 Test Your VB.NET Skills- Part II- Technology Skills 
 Understanding Pointers in C - 4th Ed.
 Undocumented DOS Through C
 Unix Shell Programming
 VC++ Gems
 VC++, COM And Beyond
 Visual C++ Programming
 Visual C++ Projects
 Working With C (For DOE - A & B Level)
 Writing TSR's Through C
 Writing Windows Device Drivers
 BPB Let US C (Hindi)
 Let Us C# (Covers C# 3.0)
 XML Fundas
 Let Us Java

External links
 Official website
 IIT Kanpur Alumni Association Page

References

Living people
Year of birth missing (living people)
IIT Kanpur alumni
Indian computer programmers